Julius Berndt Sundberg (13 September 1887, Helsinki – 15 January 1931) was a Finnish journalist and politician. He was a Member of the Parliament of Finland from 1916 to 1917, representing the Social Democratic Party of Finland (SDP). He was imprisoned for some time in 1918 for having sided with the Reds during the Finnish Civil War.

References

1887 births
1931 deaths
Journalists from Helsinki
People from Uusimaa Province (Grand Duchy of Finland)
Swedish-speaking Finns
Social Democratic Party of Finland politicians
Members of the Parliament of Finland (1916–17)
People of the Finnish Civil War (Red side)
Prisoners and detainees of Finland
Politicians from Helsinki